Ramón Martínez (1903 – death date unknown) was a Cuban third baseman in the Negro leagues in the 1920s.

A native of Havana, Cuba, Martínez played for the Cuban Stars (West) in 1928. In 31 recorded games, he posted 17 hits in 112 plate appearances.

References

External links
 and Seamheads

1903 births
Date of birth missing
Year of death missing
Place of death missing
Cuban Stars (West) players
Cuban expatriate baseball players in the United States